OpenSea is an American online non-fungible token (NFT) marketplace headquartered in New York City. The company was founded by Devin Finzer and Alex Atallah in 2017.

OpenSea offers a marketplace allowing for non-fungible tokens to be sold directly at a fixed price, or through an auction.

In 2021, following a heightened interest in non-fungible tokens, the company's revenue reached $95 million in February 2021 and $2.75 billion in September of that year. By January 2022, the company had been valued at $13.3 billion and was described as the largest non-fungible token marketplace. The daily trading volume on the OpenSea marketplace reached a record $2.7 billion on May 1, 2022, but four months later had dropped by 99%.

History 

In 2017, Devin Finzer and Alex Atallah founded OpenSea.

In September 2021, OpenSea admitted that an employee engaged in insider trading. OpenSea's Head of Product hoarded NFTs just before they were featured in the homepage.

In January 2022, OpenSea acquired Ethereum wallet-maker Dharma Labs, and OpenSea reimbursed users about $1.8 million after a user interface bug allowed users to buy more than $1 million worth of NFTs at a discount.

On January 27, 2022, OpenSea announced it would limit how many NFTs a user can create using the free minting tool. The following day, OpenSea reversed the decision following user backlash and later admitted that 80% of NFTs created with the tool were plagiarism or spam.

On February 19, 2022, some users began to report that some of their NFTs disappeared. OpenSea later revealed a phishing attack had took place on its platform via an exploit in the Wyvern Platform. The company denied rumors the source of the theft was their website, its listing systems, emails from the company, or an upgraded contract system. The next day, The Verge reported that hundreds of NFTs were stolen from OpenSea users causing a huge panic among the platform community. The estimated value of the stolen tokens is more than $1.7 million. According to OpenSea, only 32 users had been affected. OpenSea later revised their statement to note that 17 users were directly affected, while the other 15 users had interacted with the attacker but had not lost tokens as a result.

In March 2022, OpenSea announced that it would block accounts subject to United States sanctions.

On April 25, 2022, OpenSea announced the acquisition of the NFT marketplace aggregator company Gem.xyz.

In June 2022, former OpenSea product manager Nathaniel Chastain was charged with wire fraud and money laundering in connection with an insider trading scheme of digital assets.

On 30 June 2022 OpenSea reported a massive email data breach after a Customer.io staff member misused his employee access to download and share email addresses of OpenSea's users. Over 1.8 million email addresses are said to been leaked.

On 14 July 2022, chief executive Devin Finzer tweeted that the company was cutting one in five of its employees.

The daily volume of NFT transactions on OpenSea peaked at $2.7 billion on May 1, 2022, but then dropped by 99% within four months to just $9.34 million on August 28, with daily users down a third to 24,020.

Funding

Features 
In December 2020, OpenSea announced that any user can mint NFTs on its platform for free. Later, in March 2021, OpenSea announced NFT collections would not need to be approved to be listed; this decision was later criticized for allowing rampant plagiarism on the platform.

On September 17, 2021, OpenSea released an app for Android and iOS. The app allows for browsing the marketplace, but not buying or selling NFTs.

References

External links 
 
Non-fungible token
Online retailers
2017 establishments
Companies based in Manhattan